Dixie Flyer(s) may refer to:

Transportation
Dixie Flyer (automobile), an automobile built in Louisville, Kentucky from 1916 until 1923
Dixie Flyer (train), a premier Chicago-to-Florida passenger train that ran from 1892 to 1966 over several railroads.

Music
Dixie Flyers, a Canadian bluegrass band 
Dixie Flyers, an American studio band formed by Sammy Creason
Dixie Flyers, the band behind American jazz musician Joe Darensbourg
"Dixie Flyer", a song composed by Thomas Jefferson Kaye
"Dixie Flyer", a song composed by Walter Melrose
"Dixie Flyer", a  song composed by Randy Newman
"Dixie Flyer", a song composed by Jim Photoglo
"Dixie Flyer", a song composed by Marty Stuart
"Southern Dixie Flyer", a song composed by Marty Robbins

Sports
Nashville Dixie Flyers, an American minor hockey league team 
Claude Bracey or The Dixie Flyer, American sprinter